Curtis Everett Duncan (born January 26, 1965), is an American former professional football player who was a wide receiver in the National Football League (NFL).  He was selected by the Houston Oilers in the 10th round of the 1987 NFL Draft.

A 5'11", 184-lb. receiver from Northwestern University, Duncan played his entire seven-year career with the Houston Oilers during the Run & Shoot era with fellow receivers Ernest Givins, Haywood Jeffires, Drew Hill, and quarterback Warren Moon. His best year as a pro came during the 1992 season when he caught 82 receptions for 954 yards, earning him a selection to the Pro Bowl.

References

1965 births
Living people
American Conference Pro Bowl players
American football wide receivers
Northwestern Wildcats football players
Houston Oilers players
Players of American football from Detroit
Ed Block Courage Award recipients